LaQuanda Barksdale (born October 3, 1979) is a former professional basketball player in the WNBA. She was pick 12th overall in the 2001 WNBA Draft. In the 2003 WNBA season she ranked #1 in three-point field goals made per 40 minutes (3.57).

College
During her freshman year at North Carolina, Barksdale helped her team win the ACC women's basketball tournament.

North Carolina statistics
Source

Personal life
At North Carolina Barksdale majored in psychology.

References

External links
Player Bio: LaQuanda Barksdale - University of North Carolina Tar Heels Official Athletic Site - University of North Carolina Tar Heels Official Athletic Site
ESPN.com: NCW - 20 Questions: UNC's LaQuanda Barksdale

1979 births
Living people
American expatriate basketball people in Spain
American women's basketball players
Basketball players from North Carolina
North Carolina Tar Heels women's basketball players
Portland Fire players
San Antonio Stars players
Jiangsu Phoenix players
American expatriate basketball people in China
Universiade silver medalists for the United States
Universiade medalists in basketball
Forwards (basketball)
Guards (basketball)
Medalists at the 1999 Summer Universiade
United States women's national basketball team players